The Freedman-Raulerson House (also known as the Old Raulerson House or Shadow Lawn) is a historic house located at 600 South Parrott Avenue in Okeechobee, Florida.

Description and history 
The two-story, eight-room house was built in 1923 as a family home by Abraham and Maud Freedman.

On April 11, 1985, it was added to the U.S. National Register of Historic Places.

References

 Okeechobee County listings at National Register of Historic Places
 Okeechobee County listings at Florida's Office of Cultural and Historical Programs

Houses on the National Register of Historic Places in Florida
Houses in Okeechobee County, Florida
National Register of Historic Places in Okeechobee County, Florida
1923 establishments in Florida
Houses completed in 1925
Spanish Revival architecture in Florida